Halsall is a village in Lancashire, England.

Halsall may also refer to:

 Halsall (surname), derived from the village of Halsall
 Halsall railway station, a disused railway station in Halsall

See also
 Halsell